, also being the Italian title for Rebel Without a Cause) is the debut studio album by Italian singer-songwriter Mahmood. The album was released on Island Records on 22 February 2019. The album peaked at number one on the Italian Albums Chart. The album includes the singles "Uramaki", "Milano Good Vibes", "", "" and "".  was first released as an extended play on 21 September 2018.

Singles
"Uramaki" was released as the lead single from the album on 27 April 2018. The song peaked at number 86 on the Italian Singles Chart. "Milano Good Vibes" was released as the second single from the album on 31 August 2018. "Asia occidente" was released as the third single from the album on 26 October 2018. "" was released as the fourth single from the album on 7 December 2018. The song peaked at number 40 on the Italian Singles Chart.

"" was released as the fifth and final single from the album on 6 February 2019. The song peaked at number 1 on the Italian Singles Chart, becoming his first number one single in any country. The song won the 69th Sanremo Musical Festival and represented Italy in the Eurovision Song Contest 2019 in Tel Aviv, Israel, where it reached second place.

Track listing

Charts

Album

Weekly charts

Year-end charts

Extended play

Certifications

Release history

References

2019 debut albums